Jesús Javier González (born 2 February 1972), known as Jota González, is a Spanish handball head coach. He is the second manager of Paris Saint-Germain Handball. He was the manager of Liga ASOBAL club Naturhouse La Rioja, and has taken the team to the EHF Cup.

Coaching achievements

Club  
 Naturhouse La Rioja
Liga ASOBAL:
Silver Medalist: 2014, 2015, 2016    
Bronze Medalist: 2013   
Copa ASOBAL:
Finalist: 2016 
Supercopa ASOBAL:
Finalist: 2013 
Copa del Rey:
Finalist: 2013 
EHF Cup:
Semifinalist: 2010, 2011

Individual awards and recognitions 
 Liga ASOBAL Coach of the Year: 2011, 2013

References 

1973 births
Living people
Sportspeople from Valladolid
Spanish handball coaches
Spanish expatriate sportspeople in France
20th-century Spanish people
21st-century Spanish people